Adult Swim Games (stylized as [adult swim games]) is the video game publishing division of the Adult Swim brand of Cartoon Network. While Adult Swim had been publishing games since 2005, primarily based on their in-house franchises. In 2011, it became an official publisher of original indie games. The publishing division has been praised by critics for the originality and quality of its games.

History

Early history (2005–2010) 
Adult Swim partnered with Midway Games in 2005 to begin development on video games based on Aqua Teen Hunger Force, Space Ghost Coast to Coast, The Brak Show and Sealab 2021. The game based on Aqua Teen Hunger Force, Aqua Teen Hunger Force Zombie Ninja Pro-Am, was released on November 5, 2007, for PlayStation 2. The game is a golf game with fighting and racing levels. A video game based on Harvey Birdman: Attorney at Law has been released by Capcom for PlayStation 2, PlayStation Portable and Wii on January 8, 2008.

Various third-party Flash-based games, such as Robot Unicorn Attack and the Five Minutes to Kill (Yourself) series, were once available for free play on the Adult Swim website, but have been removed from the site in 2020, due to the discontinuation of Flash Player. Adult Swim have also published a number of iPhone, iPad, and Android games, including Robot Unicorn Attack 1 & 2, Amateur Surgeon, Five Minutes to Kill (Yourself): Wedding Day, and Pocket Mortys.

In December 2012, Valve announced costumes for the online first person shooter Team Fortress 2 based on Adult Swim characters. The video game Saints Row: The Third features an in game "radio station", which shuffles a collection of songs that were featured on Adult Swim shows and was hosted by Jon from Adult Swim show Delocated. The video game Poker Night 2 features Brock Samson from The Venture Bros. as a main character.

Adult Swim Games (2011–present) 
In 2011, Adult Swim hired Steve Gee to run their games division, in an effort to find original content that fit the brand of Adult Swim - described as "bizarre and absurd humor". This effort was inspired by the financial success of earlier mobile games such as Robot Unicorn Attack and Amateur Surgeon. The publisher began to seek out new indie games to partner with and publish, in an effort to provide a platform for indie games.

On February 15, 2013, Adult Swim published Super House of Dead Ninjas on Steam under their Adult Swim Games publishing label. Adult Swim Games continued to publish select indie games on Steam, including Super Puzzle Platformer Deluxe, Völgarr the Viking, Kingsway, Rain World, Jazzpunk and Duck Game.

On May 22, 2018, Adult Swim acquired their first video game development, Big Pixel Studios, the development studio behind Pocket Mortys. The studio would later close at the end of 2020 following WarnerMedia's decision to restruct the division.

In 2020, the studio would release Samurai Jack: Battle Through Time, meant to serve as a conclusion to the series.

List of games published (selection)

References 

 
Video game publishers